This is a list of open free schools in England which are formally designated as faith schools.  It should not include schools which have a faith ethos, but no formal designation as a faith school.

Church of England free schools

Primary schools

Secondary schools

Hindu free schools

Primary schools
Krishna Avanti Primary School, Leicester
Krishna Avanti Primary School, Croydon

Secondary schools
Avanti House Secondary School, Harrow

Jewish free schools

Primary schools

Secondary schools
Leeds Jewish Free School, Leeds

Multi-faith free schools

Primary schools
Hallam Fields, Birstall

Muslim free schools

Primary schools
{{columns-list|colwidth=30em|
Olive School, Preston
The Olive School Blackburn
The Olive School Hackney
The Olive School, Birmingham
The Olive School, Bolton
The Olive Tree Primary School Bolton
Zaytouna Primary School
Al-Noor Primary School Goodmayse, London

Secondary schools

Other Christian faith free schools

Primary schools

Secondary schools

Other Jewish faith free schools

Primary schools
Yavneh Primary School, Hertfordshire

Sikh free schools

Primary schools
Akaal Primary School, Derby

References

 
 
Free